Anthony Winston Mullally (born 28 June 1991), also known by the nickname of "Vegan Warrior", is a former Ireland international rugby league footballer who last played as a  for Cornwall in Betfred League One 

He has previously played for French club Carcassonne the Widnes Vikings in the Championship and the Super League. Mullally spent time on loan from Widnes at the Swinton Lions and Whitehaven in Championship 1. He played for the Huddersfield Giants in the top flight, and on loan from Huddersfield at the Dewsbury Rams and the Batley Bulldogs in the Championship and the Bradford Bulls, Wakefield Trinity Wildcats and most recently the Toronto Wolfpack in the Super League. Mullally has also played for the Leeds Rhinos in the Super League, and on loan from Leeds in the Championship.

He played for Ireland at the 2013 Rugby League World Cup and the 2017 Rugby League World Cup.

Background
Mullally was born in Widnes, Cheshire, England.

Mullally is a former vegetarian and became vegan for ethical reasons. He is known as the "Vegan Warrior".

Career
In 2011, Mullally spent a season with the Brisbane Broncos, playing 21 games for their Under-20 side.

Widnes Vikings
Mullally started his career at Championship side the Widnes Vikings in 2009 and was at the club when they won their licence to play in the Super League in 2012. 

At the end of the 2012 season after playing 17 games for the Vikings Mullally signed for Huddersfield Giants.

Huddersfield Giants
Mullally signed a 3-year deal with Huddersfield in 2013. The end of his first season with the Giants saw him earn a place in Ireland's World Cup squad. At the start of the 2014 season Mullally was sent on loan to strugglers Bradford Bulls for an initial one-month deal that was extended to a full season where he only made 6 appearances before they were relegated.

Mullally returned to the Giants in 2015 and continued to play for them until towards the end of the season where he was loaned to Wakefield Trinity Wildcats, and made 8 appearances for them and played in the Million Pound Game. He left Huddersfield after making 41 appearances and scoring 20 times.

Leeds Rhinos
Mullally signed a three-year deal with the Rhinos from 2016. He made his unofficial début against New Zealand at Headingley in 2015.

He played in the 2017 Super League Grand Final victory over the Castleford Tigers at Old Trafford.

AS Carcassonne
On 20 Sep 2020 it was reported that he had signed for AS Carcassonne in the Elite One Championship

Cornwall RLFC
On 8 Dec 2021 it was reported that he had signed for Cornwall RLFC in the RFL League 1

International
Mullally was part of Ireland's 2013 Rugby League World Cup squad in which he featured in all three of their group games. He was also selected for the Irish 2017 World Cup squad.

Honours

Super League: 2017
Million Pound Game: 2015,2019

References

External links
Toronto Wolfpack profile
Leeds Rhinos profile
(archived by web.archive.org) Castleford Tigers profile
SL profile
2017 RLWC profile

1991 births
Living people
AS Carcassonne players
Bradford Bulls players
British veganism activists
Cornwall RLFC players
English rugby league players
English people of Irish descent
Featherstone Rovers players
Huddersfield Giants players
Ireland national rugby league team players
Leeds Rhinos players
Rugby league players from Widnes
Rugby league props
Toronto Wolfpack players
Wakefield Trinity players
Widnes Vikings players